Windbag was an Australian bred Thoroughbred racehorse who won the 1925 Melbourne Cup.

1925 Melbourne Cup
Starting the 7/4 favourite, Windbag won the cup by half a length in front of a crowd of 106,828 at Flemington Racecourse.  He set a new record time for the race of 3.22.75.

After retiring from racing in 1927, Windbag commenced stallion duties where he sired 212 individual winners, including the Australian Racing Hall of Fame horse Chatham.  Windbag died in 1944 aged 23 years.

1926 racebook

Image gallery

Pedigree

References

Melbourne Cup winners
1921 racehorse births
Racehorses bred in Australia
Racehorses trained in Australia
1944 racehorse deaths